The birth of the cinema of Lithuania was in 1909.

History

First Republic. 1918-1940
On 28 July 1896, Thomas Edison live photography session was held in the Concerts Hall of the Botanical Garden of Vilnius University. After a year, similar American movies were available with the addition of special phonograph records that also provided sound. First cinema theatres opened in 1906 in Lithuania. In 1909, Lithuanian cinema pioneers  and Ladislas Starevich released their first movies. Soon the Račiūnas' recordings of Lithuania's views became very popular among the Lithuanian Americans abroad. In 1925, Pranas Valuskis filmed movie Naktis Lietuvoje (Night in Lithuania) about Lithuanian book smugglers that left first bright Lithuanian footprint in Hollywood.

The first short films in 1909 where shot by Antanas Račiūnas who filmed the sights of his native village and Vladislav Starevich who made a short film Prie Nemuno (By the Nieman River, 1909) The first Lithuanian newsreel screened in cinemas in 1921 was made by Feognijus Dunajevas.

The first film production companies and first films schools were founded in 1926. In 1927 a short film Rūpestingas tėvas (Caring Father) was produced by Lietfilm. Lithuania's most important film directors during the era were Jurgis Linartas and Vladas Sipaitis. Kareivis – Lietuvos gynėjas (The Soldier Lithuania's Defender) (1928)  and a feature film Onytė ir Jonelis (1931) produced by a film company Akis, are the most notable films of the era.

In 1927 first documentnary films were created in Lithuania - Prezidentas Suvalkijoje (President in Suvalkija) ir Nemunu į Klaipėdos uostą (Down the River Nemunas to the Port of Klaipėda) by G. Jankauskas. 

In 1931 first Lithuanian film critics journal Kino naujienos (Cinema news) established. 

Documentary movie chronicles were created by Stepas Uzdonas, Stasys Vainalavičius, Antanas Uibas, Alfonsas Žibas, Kazys Lukšys and others.

The most significant and mature Lithuanian American movie of the time Aukso žąsis (Golden goose) was created in 1965 by  that featured motifs from the Brothers Grimm fairy tales.

Period of occupation. 1940 - 1990
After the Soviet takeover in 1940 the Lithuanian Republican Newsreel Studio was founded, in 1962 it was renamed the Lithuanian Film Studio.

The first Soviet era feature film "Marytė" using Lithuanian composer and actors was produced by Mosfilm. Until 1956 all Lithuanian feature films were made in cooperation with other motion-picture studios in Soviet Union focusing on Communist themes.

After the death of Stalin in 1953 a more liberal period in Soviet Union's cultural policies followed. Filmmakers started to enjoy greater artistic control at the same time the Soviet State Committee for Cinematography (Goskino) in Moscow provided the money, state censorship body Glavlit and CPSU Department of Culture had the control over releasing the movies.

In 1957, the post-Stalinist era Lithuanian feature film Žydrasis horizontas (The Blue Horizon) was directed by Vytautas Mikalauskas.
In 1968 - Feelings (Lithuanian: Jausmai) a Lithuanian drama film was directed by Algirdas Dausa and Almantas Grikevičius. In 1997, spectators and critics recognized it the best film in Lithuania.

Film directors Gytis Lukšas, Henrikas Šablevičius, Arūnas Žebriūnas, Raimondas Vabalas were able to overcome the obstacles of censorship and create valuable films.

In the late 1980s an independent Lithuanian national cinema industry was reborn during Perestroika social and political reforms in the Soviet Union. The first independent film production studio Kinema was founded by the director Šarūnas Bartas in 1987. Another notable documentary filmmaker emerged during the era is Arūnas Matelis.

Due to Soviet occupation Jonas Mekas was forced to leave Lithuania. In New York he created Anthology Film Archives and together with his brother Adolfas Mekas, he founded Film Culture.

Second Republic. Since 1990 until present
After Lithuania regained independence on March 11, 1990 the state funding of filmmaking drastically decreased and smaller studios emerged instead. During the era about 10 documentaries and 2 feature films have been made yearly. The most notable directors have been Vytautas Žalakevičius, the director of Žvėris išeinantis is jūros (The Beast Emerging from the Sea) (1992), and Algimantas Puipa the winner of the Ecumenical Jury Prize at Lübeck Nordic Film Days and the winner of the Grand Jury Prize at the Rouen Nordic Film Festival for Vilko dantų karoliai (A Wolf Teeth Necklace) (1997).

After the restoration of the independence, Šarūnas Bartas, Audrius Stonys, Arūnas Matelis, Audrius Juzėnas, Algimantas Puipa, Dijana and her husband Kornelijus Matuzevičius received success in international movie festivals. A documentary film by Arūnas Matelis Wonderful Losers: A Different World has been shown in numerous film festivals in Europe and Asia and recognized with multiple awards.

The most internationally known film director of Lithuanian descent born in Chicago, Illinois, United States is Robert Zemeckis.

In 2011 Vilnius Film Cluster was established. Vilnius Film Cluster is an alliance which unites 31 leading audiovisual company and one of the largest universities in Lithuania. Vilnius Film Cluster basis was used for Netflix and HBO TV serials production.

In January 2014 Lithuanian Film Tax Incentive came into effect as a new policy measure to foster local and foreign film production in Lithuania. In 2016 the Lithuanian Film Centre issued 29 certificates representing a total of 1,850,646 EUR rebates. The tax incentive was increased from 20% to 30% in 2019.

Lithuanian film industry experiencing a renaissance over the last decade. The audience for Lithuanian films has reached 23% in 2015, compared with 2.48% in 2012. 21 national films were premiered in 2018. In 2018, 54 new films of various lengths and genres were created, 28 of them were feature films most of them supported by the Lithuanian Film Centre.  In 2018, Lithuanian films had 27,9 percent of the domestic market share.

Lithuania has hosted numerous major international productions in recent years, including HBO's Chernobyl,  HBO´s Beforeigners ,  Catherine the Great, BBC's War and Peace, Netflix's Tokyo Trial, Stranger Things 4th season, Young Wallander, Clark TVNorge's The Oil Fund, Swedish TV series Hamilton, Danish film Erna i krig, a film by Norwegian director Hans Petter Moland Out Stealing Horses and many more. Sometimes 5 to 6 different international crews executing filming in Lithuania at the same time. 

 Actors 
 Regimantas Adomaitis
 Donatas Banionis
 Ingeborga Dapkūnaitė (Seven Years in Tibet)
 Aurelija Mikušauskaitė
 Antanas Škėma
 Aistė Diržiūtė

Actors of Lithuanian descent:

 Laurence Harvey
 Charles Bronson
 Jacques Sernas
 George Mikell
 Ruta Lee
 Jason Sudeikis

 Directors 
 Arūnas Matelis 
 Šarūnas Bartas
 Artūras Barysas
 Romas Lileikis
 Adolfas Mekas
 Jonas Mekas
 Algimantas Puipa
 Donatas Ulvydas
 Emilija Škarnulytė
 Jonas Vaitkus
 Emilis Vėlyvis
 Vytautas Žalakevičius

 Awards 
 Sidabrinė gervė (Silver Crane)

 Festivals 
 AXX
 Ciaba Film Festival
 Kaunas International Film Festival
 Kino pavasaris

 Acclaimed Lithuanian films 

Occupied Lithuania (1940–1990)

Lithuania (1990–present)

See also
 Cinema of the world
 World cinema
 References

Further reading
 Lithuanian Cinema: Special Edition for Lithuanian Film Days in Poland 2015'', Auksė Kancerevičiūtė [ed.]. Vilnius: Lithuanian Film Centre, 2015. .

External links
 Lithuanian cinema: Facts and Figures
 Lithuanian films catalogues
 Lithuanian film centre